Karaula (Cyrillic: Караула) was a village in the municipality of Kakanj, Bosnia and Herzegovina. It was destroyed entirely during the Balkan Wars.

Demographics 
According to the 2013 census, its population was 3, all Bosniaks.

References

Populated places in Kakanj